The High Commission of Grenada in London is the diplomatic mission of Grenada in the United Kingdom. There has been a Grenadian High Commission in London since the independence of the country in 1974.

Gallery

See also
 Grenada–United Kingdom relations

References

External links
Official site

Grenada
Diplomatic missions of Grenada
Grenada–United Kingdom relations
Buildings and structures in the London Borough of Hammersmith and Fulham
West Kensington